SM UB-79 was a German Type UB III submarine or U-boat in the German Imperial Navy during World War I. She was commissioned into the German Imperial Navy on 27 October 1917 as SM UB-79.

UB-79 was surrendered in accordance with the requirements of the Armistice with Germany on 26 November 1918 and broken up at Swansea in 1922.

Construction

She was built by Blohm & Voss of Hamburg and following just under a year of construction, launched at Hamburg on 3 June 1917. UB-79 was commissioned later that same year under the command of Kptlt. Woldemar Petri. Like all Type UB III submarines, UB-79 carried 10 torpedoes and was armed with a  deck gun. UB-79 had a displacement of  while surfaced and  when submerged. Her engines enabled her to travel at  when surfaced and  when submerged.

References

Notes

Citations

Bibliography 

 

German Type UB III submarines
World War I submarines of Germany
U-boats commissioned in 1917
1917 ships
Ships built in Hamburg